Senator Farley may refer to:

Bruce A. Farley (born 1943), Illinois State Senate
E. Wilder Farley (1817–1880), Maine State Senate
Frances Farley (1923–2004), Utah State Senate
Frank S. Farley (1901–1977), New Jersey State Senate
Hugh Farley (born 1932), New York State Senate
James T. Farley (1829–1886), U.S. Senator from California
Patricia Farley (born 1974), Nevada State Senate
Reginald Farley (born 1961), Senate of Barbados
Steve Farley (born 1962), Arizona State Senate

See also
Isaac G. Farlee (1787–1855), New Jersey State Senate